Against Me!, more commonly known as Tom's Demo Tape, or simply the First Demo, is a demo album and the first release by Laura Jane Grace under the name Against Me! in June 1997. It was recorded on December 25, 1996, by Laura Jane Grace at her mother's house in Naples, FL. Physical copies of the tape are extremely rare; (likely non- existent at this point), however, all 6 tracks can easily be found circulating on YouTube.

Track listing

Personnel
Laura Jane Grace - Vocals, guitar, artwork

See also 
Against Me! discography

References

External links 

1997 albums
Punk rock albums by American artists
Demo albums
Self-released albums
Against Me! albums
Folk punk albums